This is a list of academic journals published in Serbia.

 Acta Entomologica Serbica
 Balcanica
 Belgrade Law Review
 Journal of Graphic Engineering and Design
 Metallurgical and Materials Engineering
 Journal of Mining and Metallurgy, Section B: Metallurgy
 Philotheos: International Journal for Philosophy and Theology
 Psihijatrija danas
 Serbian Astronomical Journal

See also
List of Serbian-language journals

External links
 SCIndeks

Serbia
academic journals, list of
journals, list of
Serbian-language journals